Teatro d'ira: Vol. I is the second studio album by Italian rock band Måneskin. It was released on 19 March 2021 through RCA and Sony. It includes the singles "Vent'anni" and the Sanremo and Eurovision-winning "Zitti e buoni", as well as the songs "I Wanna Be Your Slave" and "Coraline".

Following Måneskin's victory at the Eurovision Song Contest 2021 with "Zitti e buoni", the album started appearing on weekly charts across Europe. It peaked at number one on the Italian albums chart, and was certified quintuple platinum by FIMI. It also reached number one on the Finnish, Lithuanian, and Swedish album charts and reached the top ten of the charts in fourteen other territories. It has since received three other gold music certifications in three other countries.

Description 
From late 2019 until spring 2020, the band lived in London where they refined their playing skills, music style and worked on new material. This is the first part of a larger recording project entirely written by the four members of the group. Unlike the previous album Il ballo della vita (2018), the album was recorded entirely live in order to recreate the same atmosphere that Måneskin felt during the concerts held in previous years and can be heard in 1970s bootleg recordings. 

According to the band, the project's title "Teatro d'ira" and meaning are of "cathartic anger aimed at oppressions and oppressors, which leads to venting and rebelling against everything that makes you feel wrong and which, as a result, leads to a rebirth and change. We wanted to place this very powerful force in a context, that of the theater, which in the common imagination is perceived as elegant and calm. We like this antithesis: a contrast that lives when the curtain opens and, instead of a show or a ballet, we find ourselves catapulted into this explosion of energy. Theatre is a metaphor to represent art, the place where this powerful impulse generates something artistic and positive."  

This concept was reiterated by the group during the presentation of the album: "Each piece was composed entirely by us, from the first to the last note. It will be a record out of the canons, we are aware of it but we screwed it up to give you the most sincere and real version of ourselves, because the music is the only thing that matters, and this time it will be only her to speak. For now, make yourself comfortable in the armchairs, the Theatre of Wrath is about to raise its curtain."

Unlike the previous album which was inspired by their muse "Marlena", this album was inspired by them. Album lyrics are dealing with various topics related to the young generation. With "Vent'anni" and "Zitti e buoni" being social manifestos about individuality, others like "I Wanna Be Your Slave" talk about duality in love relationships, and "La paura del buio" about people who fear both the unknown and other people for being different.

Release 
The album was released by Sony Music and RCA Records, packaged as a digipak including 12-page booklet with lyrics. It was also released in a vinyl edition.

Commercial performance 
A week after its release, the album topped the FIMI Albums Chart and was certified Platinum for selling over 70,000 copies. Following the band's victory at the Eurovision Song Contest 2021, the album and its tracks - in particular, its single "Zitti e buoni" and songs "I Wanna Be Your Slave" and "Coraline" - started to enter weekly charts across Europe and beyond. By 27 May 2021, the album's tracks accumulated over 100 million streams on Spotify, and grew to over 340 million streams by 15 June. The album subsequently reached Top 15 on the Billboard World Albums Chart. On 9 July it topped the UK Rock & Metal Albums Chart.

Reception
In Rockol's 8.5/10 review, Mattia Marzi praised members playing and writing skills. According to him, it has influences of power trios from the 1970s, and Sonic Youth up to Arctic Monkeys, with individual tracks going from hard rock "Zitti e buoni", dance-rock "I Wanna Be Your Slave", power ballad "Vent'anni", gothic rock "Coraline", and garage rock "Lividi sui gomiti". He concludes it is full of "anger and fury, including biting guitar strings, powerful bass lines, hard hits on the drums. And the over-the-top interpretation of Damiano. You still have time to get on the wagon."

In Rolling Stone Italia, Claudio Tedesco's review praised the arrogance of their 20s, to be an artistic step forward in comparison to the previous studio album, the quality of their playing and production, and that are using music and lyrics to strongly say something about diversity, fragility, phobias, sex, desire for revenge, representing a world of losers like the girl from "Coraline". He criticized that it can still be heard their musical influences, although this cannot be taken into account for them because they are still young, that in some tracks Damiano is vocally overdoing the emotions but it will be appreciated in this period of time, and that sounds better in Italian than in English songs "I Wanna Be Your Slave" and "For Your Love".

In laut.de's 4/5 review, Philipp Kause found it difficult to locate their style which is somewhere between alternative-funk rock and hard rock, almost heavy metal; he saw a similarity to Red Hot Chili Peppers. That the lyrics are emotional and charged as should be in rock'n'roll, sometimes delivered in rap rock fashion, and it is good that the lyrics are mainly in Italian rather than in the English language because many nuances and metaphors used in the lyrics which also share philosophical messages would not work well in English. In conclusion, he stated that band members "bring a considerable amount with them in order not to go down in history as a one hit wonder: appealing potential as a performer, accurate craft and compositional skills."

In Ondarock's 5/10 review, Antonio Silvestri was more critical than the others, concluding the quartet is still young but ambitious and led by talented frontman Damiano David whose voice stands out, and that the album is definitely an artistic growth and only with successive recordings from the project Teatro d'ira this album will give a definitive verdict on their future and impact.

It was elected by Loudwire as the 39th best rock/metal album of 2021.

Track listing

Personnel 
Group
 Damiano David – vocals, guitar 
 Victoria De Angelis – bass guitar
 Thomas Raggi – guitar
 Ethan Torchio – drums

Production and design
 Måneskin – production
 Fabrizio Ferraguzzo – production
 Enrico La Falce – recording, engineering, mastering
 Luca Pellegrini – recording
 Enrico Brun – additional production
 Corrado "Mecna" Grilli – graphic design
 Gabriele Giussani – photography

Charts

Weekly charts

Year-end charts

Certifications

Release history

Notes

References 

2021 albums
Måneskin albums
RCA Records albums
Sony Music Italy albums